Federated States of Micronesia competed at the 2017 Asian Indoor and Martial Arts Games held in Ashgabat, Turkmenistan. They couldn't win any medal at the event.

Federated States of Micronesia made its first appearance at an Asian Indoor and Martial Arts Games along with other Oceania nations.

References 

Nations at the 2017 Asian Indoor and Martial Arts Games
2017 in Federated States of Micronesia sport